Hellenic Quest is an urban legend mostly praising the Greek language for its superiority amongst all languages.

History
The hoax circulated around Greek websites  and was widely reproduced without verification by many reputable sources from newspapers to the then Minister for National Education and Religious Affairs (see Urban legend spread below). According to the "Hellenic Quest" story, CNN reported that Apple Computer is developing a software product for teaching Ancient Greek language to foreigners and scientists, in the light of the upcoming development of supercomputers that will use Ancient Greek as their programming interface, due to this language's superior logical structure. (This prediction often attributed by the hoax writer to Bill Gates.) A prototype computer that is allegedly under development as part of this project is called "Ibycus".

The text  contains a number of factual errors, unproved assertions and exaggerations. The origin of this hoax is not clear. The author probably uses CNN and Apple Computer as a means to give more credibility to the story. The story is sometimes enhanced with linguistic-sounding arguments. It also has several obscure references to the Thesaurus Linguae Graecae project, a project undertaken by the University of California, Irvine for the purpose of digitizing all ancient and medieval Greek texts. The computer prototype "Ibycus", is the operating system implemented by David W. Packard in the early 1980s to search and browse TLG texts represented in beta code. There is no connection between Ibycus and the so-called "Hellenic Quest."

The Ancient Greek language (or any other language) has nothing to do with the binary logic that forms the basis of computers' function. Even advanced concepts in computation, such as fuzzy logic, knowledge-based systems and quantum computation have absolutely no use whatsoever for the extreme expressiveness of any of the world's languages anyway, "rich and powerful" as they may be characterized; the notions understood by computers are very basic.

Urban legend spread
The hoax was reproduced by many reputable sources like the newspaper Imerisia , the Embassy of Greece in Washington  and the Hellenic Physical Society . On January 27, 2008, the Minister for National Education and Religious Affairs of Greece, Evripidis Stylianidis, reproduced the hoax in his opening speech for the finals of the annual student debate competition, in an attempt to praise the Greek language superiority. The event took place at the old Greek parliament and it was subject of criticism by the press.

Notes

External links
Museum of Hoaxes
TLG
Technical note on beta code
Κείμενο για το Hellenic Quest 
Συλλογή αστικών μύθων για την ελληνική γλώσσα (Tumblr collection of online urban myths about Greek, in Greek)

Greek language
Internet hoaxes